North Town Centre (formerly called North Town Mall) is a shopping centre located in the northern part of Edmonton, Alberta, Canada. 

The mall underwent redevelopment completed in the summer of 2009 that included  of retail and office space and more than 900 parking stalls. Major tenants include Bed Bath & Beyond, Indigo Books and Music, London Drugs and T & T Supermarket. PetSmart opened in 2014.

Anchor tenants
 Bed Bath & Beyond (opened 2009)
 Indigo Books & Music (opened 2009)
 PetSmart (opened 2014)
 Dollarama (opened 2012)
 T & T Supermarket (opened 2009)
 Pearle Vision
 London Drugs (one of the tenants that remained when the mall changed)

Former anchors and tenants
 Rogers Plus (remained when the mall changed; closed in 2012 after the chain was dissolved)
 Party City (closed and moved to Manning Town Centre in 2021)

References

External links
Anthem Properties Overview, anthemproperties.com

Shopping malls in Edmonton
Shopping malls established in 1975
1975 establishments in Alberta